Evgeny Danilovich Agranovich (13 October 1918, Oryol, Russia – 29 January 2010, Moscow, Russia) was a Soviet poet and bard.

He was an alumnus of the Maxim Gorky Literature Institute. Eugeny Agranovich wrote many popular Russian songs including "Одесса-мама" (Odessa-mama, Odessa the Mother), "Я в весеннем лесу пил берёзовый сок" (Ya v vessennem lesu pil beryozovy sok, I Drank a Birch Sap in the Spring Forest), and "Вечный огонь" (Vechny Ogon, The Eternal Flame).

References

1918 births
2010 deaths
Soviet poets
Soviet songwriters
Maxim Gorky Literature Institute alumni